Route 88 is a  north–south state highway in the town of Westport in southeastern Massachusetts.  At just over 11 miles, it is the longest Massachusetts state route to be situated in only one town. It begins at John Reed Road and ends at an interchange with I-195.

Route description

Route 88 begins at the northern end of the Horseneck Beach State Reservation lands, on a peninsula dividing the East Branch of the Westport River from Buzzards Bay.  After just , it crosses the Normand Edward Fontaine Bridge over that river into the Westport Point section of town. The road has five at-grade intersections with stoplights and two ramped overpass intersections.

Route 88 ends just north of Route 6 and the abandoned Old Colony Rail line at an interchange with I-195, where westbound entrance and exit fly on separate overpasses over the interstate, and eastbound entrance and exit are direct ramps with no flyovers.

Route 88 is a two-lane expressway or "Super-2."  Route 88 (like other such roads) is peculiar in its design in that, while it has at-grade intersections with town roads and is not divided by barriers or grass median between the Fontaine Bridge and Old County Road (except at intersections), there is no development of any kind that abuts the route directly; the only property that comes close is an ice cream stand on the southeast corner of Route 88 and Hixbridge Road, but even this only has a driveway from Hixbridge Road.

Major intersections

References

External links

 Steve Anderson's BostonRoads.com: Horseneck Beach Connector (MA 88)

088
Transportation in Bristol County, Massachusetts